Orthogrammica is a genus of moths of the family Erebidae. The genus was erected by George Hampson in 1926.

Species
Orthogrammica bilineatus (Hampson, 1894)
Orthogrammica rufitibia Felder, 1874

References

Calpinae